This is a list of mixed martial arts events held and scheduled by the Fighting Network Rings, a mixed martial arts and professional wrestling promotion.

Past events

See also
 Fighting Network Rings

Fighting Network Rings